Sajjad Doraji is an Iranian football forward who plays for Naft Masjed Soleyman in the Iran Pro League.

Club career
Doraji started his career with youth academies in Ahvaz. He was part of Foolad U19 during the 2011–12 season. He also captained Naft Ahvaz U21 in the 2013–14 Iranian U21 Premier League. In summer 2014 he joined the Naft Masjed Soleyman training camp and was accepted in technical test by Majid Bagherinia. He made his debut for Naft Masjed Soleyman on 19 September 2014 against Naft Tehran as substitute for Milad Zeneyedpour.

Club career statistics

References

External links
 Sattar Doraji at IranLeague.ir
 Sattar Doraji at PersianLeague.com

1993 births
Living people
Iranian footballers
People from Ahvaz
Association football forwards
Naft Masjed Soleyman F.C. players
Sportspeople from Khuzestan province